Jamie Pardington (born 20 July 2000) is an English professional footballer who plays as a goalkeeper for NIFL Premiership side Larne.

He came through the youth team at Wolverhampton Wanderers, spending time on loan at Bath City, Stratford Town, Dulwich Hamlet and Mansfield Town. During the 2022–23 season he spent time with Grimsby Town.

Career

Wolverhampton Wanderers
Pardington began his career with  Rushall Olympic before signing for Wolverhampton Wanderers in August 2018. He moved on loan to Bath City in August 2019, to Stratford Town in January 2020, to Dulwich Hamlet in September 2020, and to Mansfield Town in February 2021.

He was released by Wolves at the end of the 2021–22 season.

Grimsby Town
On 27 September 2022, Pardington joined EFL League Two side Grimsby Town on a short term contract.

On 4 January 2023, Pardington was released having failed to make a first team appearance.

Larne
Following his release from Grimsby, Pardington signed for NIFL Premiership side Larne.

Career statistics

References

2000 births
Living people
English footballers
Rushall Olympic F.C. players
Wolverhampton Wanderers F.C. players
Bath City F.C. players
Stratford Town F.C. players
Dulwich Hamlet F.C. players
Mansfield Town F.C. players
Grimsby Town F.C. players
Larne F.C. players
National League (English football) players
Southern Football League players
English Football League players
Association football goalkeepers